Reginald Bowden (born 17 December 1949) is an English former professional rugby league footballer, and coach. He played for Widnes, Fulham and Warrington. He was head coach at Fulham and Warrington.

Background
Reginald Bowden was born in Widnes, Lancashire, England.

Playing career
Bowden signed for Widnes in 1968. He made his first team début in 1969.

He made 16 major cup Final appearances for Widnes, including four Wembley cup finals.

Bowden moved to Fulham in 1980. He cost the club £25,000 at a time when the world record transfer fee was £40,000.

Coaching career
He coached for two years at Warrington.

Administrative career
After leaving Warrington he joined the board of directors at Widnes, where he spent a further 10 years as a director.

References

1949 births
Living people
British rugby league administrators
English rugby league coaches
English rugby league players
Lancashire rugby league team players
London Broncos captains
London Broncos coaches
London Broncos players
Rugby league halfbacks
Rugby league players from Widnes
Warrington Wolves coaches
Warrington Wolves players
Widnes Vikings captains
Widnes Vikings players